Håkon Col is a col at the south side of the Saether Crags in the Kurze Mountains of Queen Maud Land, Antarctica. It was mapped from surveys and air photos by the Sixth Norwegian Antarctic Expedition (1956–60) and named for Håkon Saether, a medical officer with the expedition (1956–57).

References

Mountain passes of Queen Maud Land
Princess Astrid Coast